This is a list of butterflies of Eritrea. About 13 species are known from Eritrea, one of which is endemic Charaxes figini.

Papilionidae

Papilioninae

Papilionini
Papilio nireus pseudonireus Felder & Felder, 1865
Papilio dardanus figinii Storace, 1962

Pieridae

Coliadinae
Eurema brigitta (Stoll, [1780])
Eurema hecabe solifera (Butler, 1875)
Colias electo meneliki Berger, 1940
Colias marnoana Rogenhofer, 1884

Pierinae
Colotis danae eupompe (Klug, 1829)

Pierini
Belenois aurota (Fabricius, 1793)
Belenois creona boguensis (Felder & Felder, 1865)

Lycaenidae

Miletinae

Miletini
Lachnocnema abyssinica Libert, 1996

Nymphalidae

Danainae

Danaini
Amauris echeria abessinica Schmidt, 1921
Amauris ochleides Staudinger, 1896

Satyrinae

Satyrini
Ypthima condamini Kielland, 1982

See also
Geography of Eritrea

References

Seitz, A. Die Gross-Schmetterlinge der Erde 13: Die Afrikanischen Tagfalter. Plates

Butterflies
Erit
Eritrea
Eritrea
Butterflies